Thomas Nørgaard is a Danish football coach and current manager of SønderjyskE.

Nørgaard was promoted from assistant to head coach on 30 September 2017  when former head coach David Nielsen left for AGF. Before joining Lyngby, Nørgaard was both assistant and head coach at AB, whom he left after the club was relegated to the Danish 2nd Division.

His spell at Lyngby ended in relegation from the Danish Superliga and he was sacked in June 2018.

I December 2019 it was announced that Nørgaard would join B93 as manager i January 2020. He left B93 in the summer 2022, as he had accepted a job offer from AC Sparta Prague, where he was hired as an assistant coach to newly appointed Danish manager, Brian Priske.

In December 2022 he returned to Denmark to become new manager of SønderjyskE.

References

1983 births
Living people
Danish football managers
Akademisk Boldklub managers
Lyngby Boldklub managers
Boldklubben af 1893 managers
Danish 1st Division managers
SønderjyskE Fodbold managers